This is a list of 99% Invisible podcast episodes, hosted by Roman Mars. From its inception in 2010 until April 2021, 99% Invisible was produced and distributed by Radiotopia. In April 2021, the company that produces the show (99% Invisible Inc.) was acquired by SiriusXM, with 99% Invisible moving to the Stitcher Radio network.

List of episodes

2010

2011

2012

2013

2014

2015

2016

2017

2018

2019

2020

2021

2022

References

External links
 List of 99% Invisible episodes

Lists of podcast episodes
Radiotopia